Karin Leitner (born 1972) is an Austrian flautist and composer. She has played flute and piccolo with the orchestras of the Vienna State Opera and the Royal Philharmonic Orchestra.

Life

Early life and education
Born in Vienna, with Styrian ancestry, Leitner studied at the University of Music and Performing Arts Vienna with Wolfgang Schulz and at the Hochschule für Musik Freiburg with Robert Aitken.

Career
She played solo flute and piccolo with the orchestras of the Vienna State Opera, including in a stage orchestra, the Royal Philharmonic Orchestra, the BBC Symphony Orchestra and the London Mozart Players, the Irish Chamber Orchestra, the London Gala Orchestra, the Thames Chamber Orchestra, and the Vienna Mozart Orchestra. She tours internationally with solo concerts as well as chamber music concerts. Leitner gives chamber music workshops in Ireland, Northern Ireland, China, Iran, and South Africa. In 2013, she toured South Africa playing the Suite for solo flute, Op. 57, by Egon Wellesz.

Virtuosity on flute
Leitner has been described by one reviewer as having "mastery of clarity and consistency" and "a strong clear tone through all three octaves of the instrument ... flute players ... should marvel at her breath control". Others remarked on her "virtuoso exuberance" ("mit virtuoser Ausgelassenheit"), and "beautiful tone and sensitive phrasing" ("schönem Ton und einfuhlsamer Phrasierung"). Her "breath control was exemplary, intonation secure, and finger work as agile as anything the composer could have demanded".

Instruments
Leitner plays a wooden flute. She also composes music for flute, harp and orchestra.

YouTube
As of May 2019, her Youtube channel had more than 25 million views.

Discography 
Leitner's recordings include:
 2001 The Gardens of Birr Castle Demesne (flute & harp)
 2006 Castle Music (flute & harp)
 2007 Soul Alignment (Flöte & Synthesizer)
 2007 Music of Great Irish Houses (flute & harp)
 2009  Earthmagic (flute, harp and orchestra) composed by Leitner
 2013 Sky Magic 
 2016 Firemagic 
 2019 Music of Irish Drawing Rooms (flute/whistle & harp/voice)

References

External links 
 Official website
 Karin Leitner on YouTube
 
 Castle Music cduniverse.com

Austrian classical flautists
Living people
1972 births
Musicians from Vienna
Women flautists
University of Music and Performing Arts Vienna alumni